Holmenkollen is a station on the Holmenkollen Line (Line 1) on the Oslo Metro, located in the Holmenkollen area, between Besserud and Voksenlia. Until 1916 when Holmenkollbanen was completed, the terminus station was Besserud and was called Holmenkollen. The station architect was Erik Glosimodt.

The station is close to the Holmenkollbakken facility and skiing museum. The area also has several residential buildings.

References

External links

Oslo Metro stations in Oslo
Railway stations opened in 1916
1916 establishments in Norway
Holmenkollen